The white-headed starling (Sturnia erythropygia), also known as the Andaman white-headed starling, is a species of starling in the family Sturnidae. It is found in wooded habitats of the Andaman and Nicobar Islands.

References

BirdLife International 2004.  Sturnus erythropygius. 2006 IUCN Red List of Threatened Species. Downloaded on 24 July 2007.

white-headed starling
Birds of the Andaman and Nicobar Islands
white-headed starling
white-headed starling
Taxonomy articles created by Polbot